Robert A. Simmons was an African American conscientious objector and anti-war activist who was imprisoned on Alcatraz Island shortly after World War I.

Biography 
Simmons lived in Savannah, Georgia and later in Southern California.

During World War I, Simmons sought conscientious objector status after being deployed to France as a member of Company C, 323rd Labor Battalion. His anti-war stance and refusal to serve in the military led to his arrest, military court-martial, and a 10 year prison sentence at the United States Disciplinary Barracks in Fort Leavenworth, Kansas in 1919. While there, he was registered as General Prisoner #17417. On August 5, 1919, Simmons was among a group around 130 prisoners that were transferred to the Pacific Branch of the Disciplinary Barracks on Alcatraz Island where he would arrive on August 11.

Simmons was one of the conscientious objectors referred to as "absolutists," who refused to obey any military order and as a result, faced harsh punishment and extended sentences. During his imprisonment, Simmons was held in solitary confinement in "the hole" for 14 days. During his time as a prisoner, Simmons was forced to stand, chained to a cell door, and unable to sit or turn around for a total of eight hours each day. 

Simmons' incarceration was subject to wide criticism and protest among the African American community and civil rights groups. The National Civil Liberties Bureau formally petitioned the U.S. military for the release of Simmons, which reached U.S. Secretary of War Newton D. Baker.

Despite the Armistice of November 11, 1918, Simmons remained imprisoned at Alcatraz until February 27, 1920. During the duration of his sentence, Simmons spent a total of 84 days in solitary confinement, the maximum limit under U.S. army regulations at the time. 

The Messenger wrote that Simmons' "gentle sturdiness had gained for him the respect of inmates and guards alike."

Legacy 
Simmons is featured in an exhibit in the Alcatraz Dining Hall titled "The Big Lockup: Incarceration in the United States."

References 

Inmates of Alcatraz Federal Penitentiary
People from Savannah, Georgia
African Americans in Georgia (U.S. state)
Prisoners and detainees of the United States military
American anti-war activists
American conscientious objectors
Year of birth unknown
Year of death unknown